Hystrichonotus is a genus of flies in the family Empididae.

Species
H. revelator Collin, 1933

References

Empidoidea genera
Empididae